The Tapeworm Railroad (Gettysburg Rail Road) was a railway line planned by Congressman Thaddeus Stevens and nicknamed by opponents ridiculing a lengthy serpentine section around the Green Ridge of South Mountain after an orator compared the path to a tapeworm depiction on a product's packaging. Switchbacks were planned on the west slope at Hughs Forge along the E Br Antietam Creek ("Cold Spring Cr" in 1839) and on the east slope at Stevens' 1822 Maria Furnace along Toms Creek (Monocacy River), with 3 east slope tunnels through spurs of Jacks Mountain.

In 1836, Herman Haupt had surveyed the "road from Gettysburg across South Mountain to the Potomac" and in 1838, the rail "bed" was "graded for a number of miles, never got further than Monterey", and included the following (west-to-east):
 single-arch roadway bridge over Toms Creek west of Iron Springs, Pennsylvania
 multi-arch bridge
 viaduct at Virginia Mills
 deep cut near Marsh Creek
 elevated railbed on banks of Willoughby Run
 McPherson Ridge railway cut, site of the 1863 Battle of Gettysburg military engagements on McPherson Ridge
 Seminary Ridge railway cut

After Thaddeus Stevens lost his position on the Canal Commission, the commonwealth ended the railroad's financing and work was suspended in 1838, and an 1839 survey was ordered of the planned line.

The Tapeworm Railroad right-of-way was later used by the Susquehanna, Gettysburg and Potomac Railway and its successor, the Baltimore and Harrisburg Railway to build a line from Gettysburg west to Highfield, Maryland. These companies were acquired by the Western Maryland Railway in 1917.

References

External links

Defunct Pennsylvania railroads
Predecessors of the Western Maryland Railway
Railway companies established in 1838
Railway companies disestablished in 1839
1838 establishments in Pennsylvania
American companies established in 1838
American companies disestablished in 1839